Stiglitz may refer to:

 Hugo Stiglitz (born August 28, 1940), Mexican actor
 Hugo Stiglitz, a fictional character in the 2009 film Inglourious Basterds
 Jan Stiglitz, American law professor and co-founder of the California Innocence Project
 Joseph Stiglitz (born February 9, 1943), American economist
 Stiglitz Report, a 2010 book by Nobel Laureate economist Joseph Stiglitz

See also
 Steiglitz (disambiguation)
 Stieglitz (disambiguation)
 Stiglitz Commission (disambiguation)